The 1930 Cornell Big Red football team was an American football team that represented Cornell University during the 1930 college football season.  In their 11th season under head coach Gil Dobie, the Big Red compiled a 6–2 record and outscored their opponents by a combined total of 273 to 63.

Schedule

References

Cornell
Cornell Big Red football seasons
Cornell Big Red football